Sergio Canciani (born 5 July 1982) is an Italian former rower. He competed in the men's eight event at the 2004 Summer Olympics.

References

External links
 

1982 births
Living people
Italian male rowers
Olympic rowers of Italy
Rowers at the 2004 Summer Olympics
People from Latina, Lazio
Sportspeople from the Province of Latina